Jan Klawiter (born 10 November 1950) is a Polish politician. Since 2015 he has been a member of the Sejm from the parliamentary constituency of Gdynia . He was also mayor of his hometown of Rumia for ten years.

Personal life
Klawiter is of Kashubian descent. In 1973 he graduated from Gdańsk University of Technology and received his PhD when he defended his doctoral dissertation in 1982 on the implementation of liquid chromatographs. In 1977 he married Urszula Wruk. In 1979 the couple had twins, although both died during birth. In 1983 their daughter Małgorzata was born.

Klawiter is a devout Roman Catholic and a member of the Knights of the Holy Sepulcher in Jerusalem. In his youth he was the president of the local chapter of Catholic Action.

Political career
Klawiter served as mayor of his home town of Rumia from 1992 to 2002.  In 2006 he became a councilor of the Pomeranian Seym from the PiS list, and in 2010 a councilor of the Wejherowo poviat. On 15 December 2012 he was elected the chairman of the board of the Right of the Republic of Poland in the Pomeranian Voivodeship. In 2014 he ran as a candidate from the PiS list for the European Parliament, and later for the regional council. In 2015 he was elected to the Sejm.

Klawiter is heavily against Invitro fertilisation and abortion due to his Catholic faith. While he esposes many views held by the far-right in Poland, other politicians have said that Klawiter is always polite in expressing his views. Nonetheless, Dorota Wójcik, president of the Polish chapter of the Freedom From Religion Foundation expressed discomfort of Klawiter's close connection to the Knights of the Holy Sepulcher in Jerusalem and their leader Edwin Frederick O'Brien.

References

1950 births
Living people
Members of the Polish Sejm 2015–2019
Law and Justice politicians
Poland Together politicians
Right Wing of the Republic politicians
Mayors of places in Poland
People from Wejherowo County
Polish people of Kashubian descent
Polish Roman Catholics
Members of the Order of the Holy Sepulchre